Germany and Germanic lands have been invaded by foreign powers several times. Invasion of Germany may refer to the following:

Various invasions of Germania by the Roman Empire.
Roman campaigns in Germania (12 BC – AD 16)
Marcomannic Wars
Battle at the Harzhorn
Constantine the Great's German campaign
Invasion of Germania by the Huns in 375.
Various invasions of the Holy Roman Empire and other German states between 1618 and 1648 during the Thirty Years War.
Invasion of the Margraviate of Brandenburg by the Swedish Empire during the Scanian War. 
Austrian and Russian invasions of Prussia during the Third Silesian War (part of the Seven Years' War).
1757 raid on Berlin
1760 raid on Berlin
French invasion of Prussia during the Napoleonic Wars in 1806.
Plan XVII, the French plan that was put into effect in 1914 at the outbreak of World War I 
Invasion of Nazi Germany, in 1945, by the Allies during World War II.
The Saar Offensive, a failed invasion of the Saarland by France during the Phoney War
The Siegfried Line Offensive
Battle of Aachen
Battle of the Hurtgen Forest
Battle of Crucifix Hill
Battle of Fort Driant
Battle of Metz
The Western Allied invasion of Germany
Battle of the Reichswald
Battle of Cologne
Battle of the Ruhr Pocket
Battle of Remagen
Battle of Nuremberg
Battle of Hamburg
The Soviet Union invasion of Germany
Vistula-Oder Offensive
East Prussian Offensive
East Pomeranian Offensive
Silesian Offensives
Battle of Seelow Heights
Battle of Berlin